Roger Sprung (born August 29, 1930, in New York City) is an American banjo player and teacher best known for introducing authentic bluegrass banjo picking styles to the folk music community in the north and for the eclectic manner in which he has adapted bluegrass banjo techniques to music of other genres. His 1963 album Progressive Bluegrass may have been the first use of that title, later applied to a subgenre of bluegrass music by him and others.

Biography

Beginnings
Roger Sprung began playing music at the age of seven when an interest in the piano was sparked by his nanny who taught him to play a tune. Later, around age ten, Roger took formal piano lessons for about a year, but by then he had already taught himself to play by ear. He was introduced to folk music as a teenager in 1947 when his older brother took him to hear musicians perform in New York's Washington Square.  After taking up the guitar Roger soon took up the banjo, teaching himself to play by ear with the aid of 78 rpm records by Earl Scruggs. He was also influenced by Pete Seeger and Paul Cadwell, as well as Tom Paley, from whom he took a few banjo lessons.  In 1950, Sprung made the first of many trips to bluegrass country, accompanying mandolinist Harry West to Asheville, North Carolina.  There he had his first exposure to such traditional country musicians as Bascom Lamar Lunsford and Samantha Bumgarner.  These trips became a regular part of Sprung's musical life, and he passed along the styles and techniques he absorbed during them to his fellow musicians in the north.  As  bluegrass historian and performer Ralph Lee Smith wrote, "Banjo player Roger Sprung almost single-handedly introduced Southern bluegrass music to New York through his playing in Washington Square."

In 1953 Sprung joined Erik Darling and Bob Carey to form the Folksay Trio.  The group recorded four tracks on an anthology album that also included performances by Lead Belly and Woody Guthrie.  One of the trio's songs, "Tom Dooley," would later be popularized by the Kingston Trio and become one of the best-selling folk song recordings of all time. Carey and Darling later joined Alan Arkin, who would go on to achieve fame as an actor, to form the highly successful folk group The Tarriers. 

Sprung was also a familiar face in the mid-1950s Washington Square gatherings of folk musicians in Greenwich Village. When the first edition of The Village Voice featured a page one story about the music scene, Sprung was one of the players interviewed by John Wilcock for the article, and was featured in the lead sentence: "Roger Sprung, 25, runs a TV repair shop in Lake Mohegan, New York, but every week end during the summer he comes to the Village to play and sing folk music in Washington Square..." "Music Makers Quit the Square, But Only for the Wintertime" 

In 1957, Sprung formed another group, The Shanty Boys, with Lionel Kilberg and Mike Cohen.

Career
Over the past six decades, Sprung has performed with such legendary folk musicians as Jean Ritchie and Doc Watson as well as with more recent country music artists Willie Nelson, Wynonna Judd, and Tanya Tucker. He has recorded with Guy Lombardo and the Royal Canadians and toured with popular jazz singer Kay Starr. His television appearances include the Jimmy Dean, Garry Moore, and Dean Martin Shows, and he has performed at both the Lincoln Center and Carnegie Hall. For the past quarter century he has performed with guitarist Hal Wylie and various other musicians as "Roger Sprung, Hal Wylie and the Progressive Bluegrassers."  Sprung appears frequently at folk festivals and musical conventions, including the Philadelphia Folk Festival, at which he performed for 30 consecutive years,<ref name=NancyCrevier>Nancy K. Crevier, "Roger Sprung: Newtown's Own 'Pioneer of Bluegrass'," The Newtown Bee, June 18, 2009, accessed October 24, 2009.</ref> and the Union Grove Fiddler's Convention in North Carolina, where in 1970 he was winner of the banjo competition. 

In the 1970s, he was a frequent visitor to the annual New England Fiddle Contest in Hartford, and a photo of fiddlers jamming with him  was a frequently reprinted item in the contest's press kit, and on the home page of the revived contest in 1999.

In addition to his performing and recording career, Sprung sells and repairs banjos and has been teaching banjo and other instruments since 1950.  Notable among his former students were Erik Darling and John Stewart, who became replacement members of The Weavers and the Kingston Trio, respectively.

Repertoire
Sprung's recordings and concert appearances embrace a variety of musical genres.  In addition to traditional bluegrass and ragtime music, his repertoire includes arrangements of Elizabethan and classical pieces, Broadway show tunes, jazz and big band standards, and holiday songs.  Composers whose works he has arranged for banjo include Mozart, Weill, Sousa, Ernesto Lecuona, and Stephen Foster.  Among the selections he has recorded are ones as musically diverse as "Hava Nagila", "Hello, Dolly," "Turkey in the Straw," "Jingle Bells," "Puff, the Magic Dragon," "The World Is Waiting for the Sunrise," and "Mrs. Brown, You've Got a Lovely Daughter."

Sprung's instrument is a 1927 Gibson which he reconstructed himself using parts from two other Gibson banjos.

 Discography 
 American Folksay: Ballads and Dances, Vol. 2, The Folksay Trio (1953)  (Stinson)
 Off-Beat Folk Songs, The Shanty Boys (1958) (Elektra)
 Progressive bluegrass. Vol. 1, Roger Sprung & his Progressive Bluegrassers (1963) (Folkways Records)
 Progressive ragtime bluegrass 2 and other instrumentals, Roger Sprung & his Bluegrass All-Stars (1964) (Folkways Records)
 Progressive bluegrass. Vol. 3, Five string banjo specialties, Roger Sprung & his Progressive Bluegrassers (1965) (Folkways Records)
 Grassy licks, Roger Sprung & his Progressive Bluegrassers (1966) (Verve/Folkways)
 Roger Sprung & his Progressive Bluegrassers, Roger Sprung & his Progressive Bluegrassers (1967) (Showcase)
 Bluegrass blast : a mixed bag of ol' timey music, Roger Sprung & Hal Wylie & the Progressive Bluegrassers (1974) (Folkways Records)
 Bluegrass Gold, Hal Wylie & Roger Sprung & the Progressive Bluegrassers (1978) (Showcase)
 Bluegrass Gold, Vol. 2, Roger Sprung & the Progressive Bluegrassers (Showcase)
 New and Original Sound of Irish-Grass (1982) (Showcase)
 Pickin' on the mountain, Roger & Joan Sprung (Showcase)
 Roger & Joan'', Roger & Joan Sprung (Showcase)

Notes

References

External links
Official Website, Roger Sprung – Bluegrass Banjo Pioneer.
Smithsonian Folkways, Liner notes for "Progressive Bluegrass, Vol. 3".

1930 births
American folk musicians
Musicians from New York City
Old-time musicians
American banjoists
Living people